{{DISPLAYTITLE:N,N-Dicyclohexylcarbodiimide}}N,N′-Dicyclohexylcarbodiimide (DCC or DCCD''') is an organic compound with the chemical formula (C6H11N)2C.  It is a waxy white solid with a sweet odor.  Its primary use is to couple amino acids during artificial peptide synthesis. The low melting point of this material allows it to be melted for easy handling. It is highly soluble in dichloromethane, tetrahydrofuran, acetonitrile and dimethylformamide, but insoluble in water.

Structure and spectroscopy
The C−N=C=N−C core of carbodiimides (N=C=N) is linear, being related to the structure of allene. The molecule has idealized C2 symmetry.

The N=C=N moiety gives characteristic IR spectroscopic signature at 2117 cm−1. The 15N NMR spectrum shows a characteristic shift of 275 ppm upfield of nitric acid and the 13C NMR spectrum features a peak at about 139 ppm downfield from TMS.

Preparation
DCC is produced by the decarboxylation of cyclohexylisocyanate using phosphine oxides as a catalyst:
2 C6H11NCO  →  (C6H11N)2C  +  CO2

Alternative catalysts for this conversion include the highly nucleophilic OP(MeNCH2CH2)3N.

Other methods
Of academic interest, palladium acetate, iodine, and oxygen can be used to couple cyclohexyl amine and cyclohexyl isocyanide. Yields of up to 67% have been achieved using this route:
 C6H11NC + C6H11NH2 + O2 →  (C6H11N)2C + H2O

DCC has also been prepared from dicyclohexylurea using a phase transfer catalyst. The disubstituted urea, arenesulfonyl chloride, and potassium carbonate react in toluene in the presence of benzyl triethylammonium chloride to give DCC in 50% yield.

Reactions
Amide, peptide, and ester formation
DCC is a dehydrating agent for the preparation of amides, ketones, and nitriles. In these reactions, DCC hydrates to form dicyclohexylurea (DCU), a compound that is nearly insoluble in most organic solvents and insoluble in water. The majority of the DCU is thus readily removed by filtration, although the last traces can be difficult to eliminate from non-polar products. DCC can also be used to invert secondary alcohols. In the Steglich esterification, alcohols, including even some tertiary alcohols, can be esterified using a carboxylic acid in the presence of DCC and a catalytic amount of DMAP.

In protein synthesis (such as Fmoc solid-state synthesizers), the N-terminus is often used as the attachment site on which the amino acid monomers are added. To enhance the electrophilicity of carboxylate group, the negatively charged oxygen must first be "activated" into a better leaving group. DCC is used for this purpose. The negatively charged oxygen will act as a nucleophile, attacking the central carbon in DCC. DCC is temporarily attached to the former carboxylate group forming a highly electrophilic intermediate, making nucleophilic attack by the terminal amino group on the growing peptide more efficient.

Moffatt oxidation
In combination with dimethyl sulfoxide (DMSO), DCC effects the Pfitzner-Moffatt oxidation. This procedure is used for the oxidation of alcohols to aldehydes and ketones. Unlike metal-mediated oxidations, such as the Jones oxidation, the reaction conditions are sufficiently mild to avoid over-oxidation of aldehydes to carboxylic acids. Generally, three equivalents of DCC and 0.5 equivalents of proton source in DMSO are allowed to react overnight at room temperature. The reaction is quenched with acid.

Other reactions
Reaction of an acid with hydrogen peroxide in presence of DCC leads to formation of peroxide linkage.
Alcohols can also be dehydrated using DCC. This reaction proceeds by first giving the O-acylurea intermediate which is then hydrogenolyzed to produce the corresponding alkene:
RCHOHCH2R′ + (C6H11N)2C → RCH=CHR′ + (C6H11NH)2CO
Secondary alcohols can be stereochemically inverted by formation of a formyl ester followed by saponification. The secondary alcohol is mixed directly with DCC, formic acid, and a strong base such as sodium methoxide.
In the presence of DMAP, DCC self-condenses two molecules of phenylacetic acid and its substituted derivatives to produce a bisbenzyl ketone.

Biological action
DCC is a classical inhibitor of ATP synthase. DCC inhibits ATP synthase by binding to one of the c'' subunits and causing steric hindrance of the rotation of the FO subunit.

Safety
DCC is a potent allergen and a sensitizer, often causing skin rashes.

See also
 Carbodiimide

References

External links
 An excellent illustration of this mechanism can be found here: .

Dehydrating agents
Peptide coupling reagents
Carbodiimides
Biochemistry
Biochemistry methods
Reagents for biochemistry
Allergology
Sweet-smelling chemicals
Cyclohexyl compounds